SAREX has several meanings:

a  Search and Rescue Exercise (SAREX) of the US Military, see U.S. Air Force Auxiliary
Shuttle Amateur Radio Experiment